Robert David Matthews (born 14 October 1970) is an English former footballer who played as a striker.

References

External links

1970 births
Living people
Sportspeople from Slough
English footballers
Association football forwards
Loughborough University F.C. players
Notts County F.C. players
Luton Town F.C. players
York City F.C. players
Bury F.C. players
Stockport County F.C. players
Blackpool F.C. players
Halifax Town A.F.C. players
Hull City A.F.C. players
Northwich Victoria F.C. players
Mossley A.F.C. players
English Football League players
National League (English football) players
Alumni of Loughborough University
Footballers from Berkshire